"Bleeding Love" is a song recorded by English singer Leona Lewis for her debut studio album Spirit (2007). It was written and originally recorded by Jesse McCartney, and was co-written and produced by Ryan Tedder. The song was released as the lead single from Spirit on September 16, 2007, by Syco Music and J Records.

Debuting at number one on the UK Singles Chart and the Irish Singles Chart, "Bleeding Love" became the best-selling single of 2007 in both countries. After the single's release, it became a major international hit and was the best-selling single of 2008 worldwide. The single reached number one in 35 countries, including Japan, France, Germany and the United States, making it only the second song in history to achieve this feat, Elton John's "Candle in the Wind 1997" being the first. The accompanying music video first aired on 17 October 2007, and was uploaded to YouTube on the same day.

"Bleeding Love" has sold more than one million copies in the United Kingdom, and over 4 million digital downloads in the United States, where it was the best-selling digital song there in 2008. It was named the 17th most successful song in the US from 2000 to 2009. "Bleeding Love" has charted on the UK Singles Chart in three different years: in 2007 it peaked at number one; 2008 at number 76; and 2009 at number 97. It sold 788,000 copies in the UK alone during 2007. "Bleeding Love" was nominated for Record of the Year and Best Female Pop Vocal Performance at the 51st Grammy Awards. At the 2008 Brit Awards it was nominated for Best British Single. It is Lewis's biggest hit in the US to date and remains her signature song. As of 2021, the song has been streamed over two billion times.

Background

In 2006, Lewis entered the third series of the British reality singing competition, The X Factor, and after performing and competing against other aspiring hopefuls, the British public voted her the winner on 16 December 2006, receiving 60% of the final vote. As the winner, Lewis received the prize of a £1 million recording contract with Sony BMG, of which Simon Cowell is an A&R executive, and with Cowell's own record label, Syco Music.

Meanwhile, in February 2007, OneRepublic frontman Ryan Tedder and singer and songwriter Jesse McCartney had written the song "Bleeding Love" for McCartney's third studio album, Departure. However, his record label, Hollywood Records, did not like the song. Tedder believed it was a "massive" song and the record company was "out of [their] mind". Despite his own reality TV background, Tedder had previously made the decision not to work with contestants from the singing competition American Idol, but he had not heard of The X Factor, and on being shown a website about Lewis, he thought that "her voice just sounded unreal", saying that "from a writer's perspective, this girl – with or without a TV show – has one of the best voices I've ever heard". On hearing that Cowell was looking for songs for Lewis's debut album, Tedder rearranged "Bleeding Love", changed the key and tailored it to suit her voice. They pitched the song to Cowell, who said it was "the one". After the success of Lewis's version, the song was re-recorded by McCartney being included as a bonus track on the international version of the album, Departure.

Recording and production 
"Bleeding Love" was written by Ryan Tedder and Jesse McCartney for Lewis's debut studio album, Spirit (2007). Production of the song was helmed by Tedder. It was recorded at several recording studios, including Mansfield Studios, Los Angeles; The Record Plant, Hollywood, California and Encore Studios, Burbank, CA. "Bleeding Love" was recorded at these locations by Tedder and Craig Durrance, and were assisted in the process by Nate Hertweck. Programming and arrangement was carried out by Tedder. The song was mixed by Phil Tan at Soapbox Studios, Atlanta, GA, and he was assisted by Josh Houghkirk. The song's string arrangement was completed by Tedder.

Composition 

"Bleeding Love" is a pop song with R&B undertones set in the key of F major. It moves at 104 bpm and is set in  time. The album version runs for four minutes and twenty-two seconds and the radio edit runs for four minutes and one second. Lewis' vocal range extends from C4 to B5, but has gone higher into the sixth octave in most live performances. "Bleeding Love" is constructed in the common verse–chorus–bridge song pattern. It employs a church organ which is audible throughout the song until the bridge. Synthesized strings are also prominent throughout the song, which intermittently integrates wood block percussion throughout the track. A heavy, distorted marching band-like drum loop backs the song. The song employs a harmonic shift beginning at the bridge. A harmonic shift or harmonic variety generally identifies most song bridges. In "Bleeding Love" the turn around from the common I, vi, IV, V (F, Dm, Bb, C) progression used exclusively up to the bridge for both verses and choruses shifts to focus on the relative minor: vi, IV, I/V, V (Dm, Bb, F/C, C).

McCartney wrote the song about his longtime girlfriend and said: "I kept thinking about being in love so much that it hurts. I was away from my girlfriend for four months at the time and I really wanted to [quit] and fly home. I was so in love that it was painful. It was like bleeding, it cut me open." The song refers to someone in a relationship who is extremely blinded by love. Regardless of the numerous warnings from her friends and the fact that she is emotionally hurt by her lover, she continues to love him and accepts the pain. Metaphorically, this is represented in his "cutting her open". However, all she can do is "bleed love" for him.

Promotion 

The song's first radio play was on the BBC Radio 1 Chart Show on 16 September 2007, and was quickly followed by an online exclusive streaming by celebrity blogger Perez Hilton. It was reported that over 1.5 million people listened to the song online. The song was also Scott Mills's record of the week from Monday 24 September to Friday 28 September. Lewis went on a two-day regional UK radio tour to promote the single and album on 11 and 12 October 2007. This was followed by an appearance on This Morning on 15 October. Lewis performed the song live on the fourth series of The X Factor on 20 October 2007, and also made appearances on several other TV and radio shows such as T4, GMTV and Loose Women.

Lewis also performed the song at the Festival della canzone italiana on 29 February 2008, and on German entertainment show Wetten, dass..? on 1 March 2008. Lewis made her US television debut on The Oprah Winfrey Show, on 17 March 2008, where she sang "Bleeding Love". She has also performed on Good Morning America on 4 April 2008, Live With Regis and Kelly on 8 April 2008,  Jimmy Kimmel Live!, The Ellen DeGeneres Show on 11 April 2008, and The Tyra Banks Show on 17 April 2008. Lewis performed the song live on the seventh season of American Idol on Wednesday 23 April 2008.

Critical reception 

"Bleeding Love" received critical acclaim from music critics. Showbiz Spy described the song as "emotionally fuelled", and opined, "this track perfectly showcases Leona's impressive vocal prowess and from the moment she opens her mouth we are instantly reminded about her amazing voice, capable of heart stopping intensity and a playful light touch". Digital Spy's review of the song gave it four stars out of five, saying it is "easily the best single to be released by an X Factor star", and describing it as "a brilliantly smart pop record, managing to offer the lovelorn balladry that Lewis's X Factor fans are no doubt craving, while also suggesting a hint of street cred in the form of some beefy, vaguely modish beats". It came second in Digital Spy's Top 20 Singles of 2007 announced on 31 December.

However, BBC America's reviewer expressed that "the inventive percussion can't stop 'Bleeding Love' from sounding dated, like filler on some long-lost, late '90s Mariah Carey album. It's one of those mid-tempo numbers – too slow for the club, too fast for the foxtrot. Actually, with its marching band drum beat, it sounds as much like Gwen Stefani's 'Hollaback Girl' as a ballad can." The critic continues to say, "On to the positive: Lewis wisely restrains her vocals, never devolving into those vocal acrobatics that have historically plagued Christina Aguilera." Billboard's review by Singles Review Editor Chuck Taylor for "Bleeding Love", the first ahead of the song's release in the United States, stated it was "a colossal and timeless debut", going on to say "not only a one-listen harmonic show-stopper, it is also hip, soulful, beat-rippling and an undeniable vocal tour de force". The Village Voice described the song as a "perfectly devised emo-pop machine ... the old Mariah is jealous right now".

Accolades 
"Bleeding Love" has earned Lewis numerous awards and nominations. In December 2007, "Bleeding Love" won The Record of the Year and the award for Best Track in the Virgin Media Music Awards 2007. In January 2008, the song was nominated for the British Single award at the 2008 BRIT Awards. Although the award was won by Take That's "Shine", it was announced that "Bleeding Love" had received the second highest number of public votes. The massive success of "Bleeding Love" earned Lewis the music award at Britain's Best 2008, which was aired on ITV1 on Friday 23 May 2008. On 3 December 2008, the song was nominated for Record of the Year and Best Female Pop Vocal Performance at the 51st Annual Grammy Awards, but lost to Alison Krauss and Robert Plant's "Please Read the Letter" and Adele's "Chasing Pavements", respectively. Rolling Stone magazine ranked the song 25th in the list of The 100 Best Singles of 2008. In April 2009, Tedder and McCartney were awarded with the Song of the Year Award at the 26th Annual ASCAP Pop Music Awards for writing "Bleeding Love". In September 2011, "Bleeding Love" was ranked number 67 by VH1 on its list for the 100 Greatest Songs of the '00s.

The song has been ranked 129th by Billboard on its 600 most massive smashes over the chart's six decades.

Chart performance 
In the United Kingdom, "Bleeding Love" debuted at number one on the UK Singles Chart on 28 October 2007 ― for the week ending dated 3 November 2007. With "Bleeding Love" reaching number one, Lewis became the first contestant from The X Factor to achieve two number-one singles. It was reported to be outselling Take That's "Rule the World" by three-to-one in chain store Woolworths. The single went on to sell 218,805 copies in its first week, gaining the biggest one-week sales in 2007, a feat it maintained until "When You Believe" by Leon Jackson - her successor as winner of the UK X Factor - was released in December 2007. In its second and third weeks on sale the single sold 158,370 copies, and 111,978 copies respectively, bringing the total sales to 489,153 and making "Bleeding Love" the biggest-selling single of 2007 after just three weeks of release. It stayed at the top of the chart for seven weeks, the longest run from a homegrown female solo artist in British chart history, until Adele's "Easy on Me" spent eight weeks at number one in 2021 and 2022. By the end of 2007 the single had sold a total of 788,000 copies, becoming Britain's biggest-selling single of 2007. It was the first time a single by a British female solo artist had topped the end of year singles sales chart in the then fifty five-year history of the Official Charts Company. The British Phonographic Industry certified "Bleeding Love" platinum on 18 January 2008 and triple platinum on 5 March 2021. In February 2014, it was confirmed by the Official Charts Company that "Bleeding Love" had sold total of 1,180,000 copies in the United Kingdom, making it the 103rd song overall to sell a million copies in Britain, with Lewis the fourteenth female singer to achieve the feat.

In Australia, "Bleeding Love" debuted at number nine on the ARIA Singles Chart on 24 December 2007, and went on to top the chart on 21 January 2008. On 10 February 2008, the single received a platinum certification, with sales of over 70,000. In New Zealand, Lewis became the first British female solo artist to have a number one single since the Sugababes’ "Push the Button" topped the chart in January 2006; it stayed at number one for five weeks. It also reached number one in Switzerland, France, Norway, Belgium and the Netherlands. In Spain, the single reached number two on the Spanish Singles Chart by PROMUSICAE. It was certificated Platinum with sales over 40,000 units. "Bleeding Love" was a hit on radio stations around the world, reaching number one in the airplay charts of the United Kingdom, Switzerland, Germany, Australia, New Zealand, Luxembourg, Slovakia, Latin America, Estonia and Japan. In the Greek Airplay Chart, it reached number two. In Italy the song peaked at number 2 on the FIMI Singles Chart based only on digital downloads; instead it peaked at number one on the Italian Musica&Dischi Singles Chart, which is based on digital downloads and CD single sales, for 13 non-consecutive weeks.

In the United States, the single was released digitally on 18 December 2007, and debuted on the Bubbling Under Hot 100 Singles chart at number 11. The song officially debuted on the Billboard Hot 100 on 1 March 2008 at number 85. The song became Lewis's first U.S. top ten hit, and reached number one on the Billboard Hot 100 three separate times: twice for one week and once for two weeks. It also hit number one on subsidiary charts, including Hot Digital Songs, and Hot Adult Contemporary Tracks, where it spent 52 weeks. Lewis is the third female artist from the UK to have a number one hit with a debut U.S. single, following Petula Clark with "Downtown" (1965) and Sheena Easton with "Morning Train (Nine to Five)" (1981). It became the second single to have three separate turns atop the Hot 100, following Chic's "Le Freak" (1979). During this time, the parent album Spirit debuted at number one on the Billboard 200, making Lewis the first solo British artist in 18 years to simultaneously top both the Billboard albums and singles charts. On the Billboard End of Decade Chart, "Bleeding Love" was 17th. The song has sold 4,589,000 digital downloads in the U.S. by December 2013.

In Canada, the song peaked at number one on the Canadian Hot 100 dated 5 April 2008.

Music videos 

There are two music videos for "Bleeding Love". The first was directed by Melina Matsoukas and was filmed in Los Angeles. It is set in a mock apartment block and features six storylines about couples in different stages of relationships. Lewis stated that it is "real colourful, very funky, has lots of extras and I get to really perform". Melina explained her meaning of the video in an interview on MTV's Making the Video, saying that the water in the video is a metaphor for the tenants' love problems, as if the apartments are bleeding love. The international version of the video was first posted to YouTube on 17 October 2007, and which now has over 187 million views.

Lewis filmed a second video in New York City for the US release of "Bleeding Love". The treatment for the video was written by Ryan Tedder, and centres on a storyline involving Lewis arguing with her boyfriend, played by model Nicholas Lemons. It was directed by Jessy Terrero. The video premiered in the United States on 29 January 2008 on Yahoo! Music, and was uploaded to YouTube on 30 January 2008. Its television debut was on 4 February 2008 on VH1 as part of their "You Oughta Know" campaign. This video has over 234 million views on YouTube.

The international version of the music video was nominated for Best UK Video at the 2008 MTV Video Music Awards. The US version was number one on the VH1 Year-End Top 40.

Track listing and formats 

 CD single 
 "Bleeding Love" (Album Version)  – 4:21
 "Forgiveness"  – 4:26
 Maxi single 
 "Bleeding Love" (Album Version)  – 4:21
 "Forgiveness"  – 4:21
 "A Moment Like This"  – 4:17
 "Bleeding Love" (video)

 U.S. CD promotional single 
 "Bleeding Love" (Radio Edit)  – 3:59
 "Bleeding Love" (Album Version)  – 4:21
 "Bleeding Love" (Call Out Hook)  – 0:10
 U.S. digital single 
 "Bleeding Love" (Album Version)  – 4:22
 Moto Blanco Remixes
 "Bleeding Love" (Moto Blanco Remix Radio Edit) – 3:38
 "Bleeding Love" (Moto Blanco Remix Full Vocal) – 8:39
 "Bleeding Love" (Moto Blanco Remix Dub) – 8:25

Credits and personnel 
Credits adapted from the liner notes of Spirit, Syco Music, J Records, Sony Music Entertainment.

Recording
 Recorded at Mansfield Studios, Los Angeles; The Record Plant, Hollywood, CA; Encore Studios, Burbank, CA.
 Mixed at Soapbox Studios, Atlanta, GA.

Personnel
 Songwriting – Ryan Tedder, Jesse McCartney
 Production – Ryan "Alias" Tedder
 Programming and arrangement – Ryan "Alias" Tedder
 Vocal recording – Ryan "Alias" Tedder, Craig Durrance
 Assistant vocal recording – Nate Hertweck
 Mixing – Phil Tan
 Assistant mixing – Josh Houghkirk
 String arrangement – Ryan "Alias" Tedder

Charts

Weekly charts

Year-end charts

Decade-end charts

All-time charts

Certifications

Release history

Tom Dice version 

"Bleeding Love" was covered by Belgian singer-songwriter Tom Dice after he won the Flemish version of The X Factor in 2008. He released his version, on 25 May 2010, from his debut album, which he titled Teardrops. The single reached number 7 in Belgium.

Track listing

Chart performance

The Wombats version 
"Bleeding Love" was covered by indie rock band The Wombats and was released as a single on 3 November 2008.

Track listing 
 Digital download
 "Bleeding Love" – 4:08

See also

Notes

References

External links 
 
 

2007 songs
2007 singles
2008 singles
Leona Lewis songs
Jesse McCartney songs
Billboard Hot 100 number-one singles
Number-one singles in Australia
Number-one singles in Austria
Ultratop 50 Singles (Flanders) number-one singles
Canadian Hot 100 number-one singles
European Hot 100 Singles number-one singles
SNEP Top Singles number-one singles
Number-one singles in Germany
Irish Singles Chart number-one singles
Billboard Japan Hot 100 number-one singles
Dutch Top 40 number-one singles
Number-one singles in New Zealand
Number-one singles in Norway
Number-one singles in Poland
Number-one singles in Scotland
Number-one singles in Slovakia
Number-one singles in Switzerland
UK Singles Chart number-one singles
Songs written by Ryan Tedder
Songs written by Jesse McCartney
Music videos directed by Jessy Terrero
Music videos directed by Melina Matsoukas
2000s ballads
Pop ballads
Contemporary R&B ballads
Song recordings produced by Ryan Tedder
Syco Music singles
J Records singles